Armed Forces Medical College may refer to:

 Armed Forces Medical College (Bangladesh)
 Armed Forces Medical College (India)